Mountainview Christian School (also known as MCS) is a private, Christian school located in Salatiga, Central Java, Indonesia. The school has a population of about 300 students and offers an educational program from kindergarten to 12th grade.

History
The school began as the vision of missionaries to give their children a Christian education and to prepare them for the world. In the fall of 1981, the school began in a small, rented house as Central Java Inter-Mission School (CJIMS). The school had fifteen students and three teachers.

Soon the number of students grew, and the originally rented house grew crowded. The school relocated to another house in a village area. When the school was moved, the original house was refurbished as the first dormitory.

More teachers and even more students came from many nations. By 1986, the second school building had also become insufficient for the increasing student population. A high school facility was built on a piece of rented land not far from the second school building. The elementary remained in the second school for a time, but two years later a large plot of land was purchased by the organizing foundation and a new elementary school was built to accommodate the increasing number of students and staff. The second school building became a second dormitory. The new school campus was opened in 1990.

The land was cleared and four dorms, a high school, a soccer field and track, an auditorium, a lunch pavilion, more elementary buildings, and a two-court gym have been built.

In October 2001, 144 students and 60 teachers with American nationality were off temporary after anti-American protests. In 2002, the name of the school was changed to Mountainview International Christian School.

In January 2015, the name of the school was changed to Mountainview Christian School (MCS) from the previous Mountainview International Christian School (MICS)

Athletics
MCS is a member of the Indonesian International Small Schools Activities Conference, or IISSAC. MCS participates in the soccer and basketball events. Swimming, cross country running, and most recently badminton, with MCS girls doubles winning the first event in 2013.

In 2007, MICS hosted the IISSAC basketball tournament and won first-place trophies for both boys' and girls' basketball.

In 2010, MICS hosted the IISSAC basketball tournament and won first-place trophy for boys' basketball.

In 2011, 2012, and 2013 MICS varsity boys' basketball team won the first-place trophy in the IISSAC basketball tournament that was hosted in Bali, Bandung, and Surabaya making them four-time consecutive champions.

In 2016, MCS' girls' basketball team won the IISSAC tournament in the final against Wesley International School, Malang.

In 2016, MCS hosted the IISSAC swimming tournament and won first-place banners for both boys' and girls' cross-country.

In 2017, MCS hosted the IISSAC badminton and cross country invitational, won both banners for boys and girls cross country, and second place for boys and girls badminton.

In 2018, MCS hosted the IISSAC basketball and cross country invitational, and won both boys' and girls' basketball tournaments.

In 2022, the girls and boys basketball team became champions of the IISSAC tournament that was held in Surabaya Intercultural School, Surabaya.

Clubs and events
MCS offers students the opportunity to participate in extracurricular activities such as drama club, various sports, and worship dance team. Events include the Field Day, sports tournaments (school-wide as well as IISSAC), the Christmas Concert and Bazaar, and school retreats.

References

External links

Official School Website

salatiga
Schools in Indonesia
Christian schools in Indonesia
International schools in Indonesia
Education in Central Java